The Divided Parishes and Poor Law Amendment Act 1882 was an Act of Parliament in Britain which gave the Local Government Board increased powers relating to dissolving and creating poor law unions. It followed the similar Divided Parishes and Poor Law Amendment Act 1876 (39 & 40 Vict.)
.

See also
List of Acts of Parliament of the United Kingdom Parliament, 1880-1899

References

Poor Law in Britain and Ireland
United Kingdom Acts of Parliament 1882